Lisbon is a 1999 Argentine-Spanish thriller directed by Antonio Hernández which stars Carmen Maura, Federico Luppi, Sergi López, and Laia Marull.

Cast

Release 
Distributed by Alta Films, it was theatrically released in Spain on 23 July 1999.

Accolades 

|-
| align = "center" | 2000 || 14th Goya Awards || Best Actress || Carmen Maura ||  || 
|}

See also 
 List of Spanish films of 1999
 List of Argentine films of 1999

References

External links 

1999 thriller films
1999 films
Spanish thriller films
1990s Spanish-language films
1990s Spanish films
1990s Argentine films